Modern Dairy is a Chinese dairy and the largest producer of milk in China.  The dairy counts 15 industrial farms and an additional 4 are under construction.  KKR is a major investor, putting in along with other investors $150 million into the dairy.

References

Companies based in Anhui
Dairy products companies of China